The eighth government of Israel was formed by David Ben-Gurion on 7 January 1958, and was the second government of the third Knesset. Ben-Gurion kept the same coalition partners as during the previous government, i.e. Mapai, the National Religious Party, Mapam, Ahdut HaAvoda, the Progressive Party, the Democratic List for Israeli Arabs, Progress and Work and Agriculture and Development. The only change to the cabinet was the addition of Shlomo-Yisrael Ben-Meir as a Deputy Minister.

All ministers and deputy ministers from the National Religious Party left the cabinet on 1 July 1958.

The government collapsed following Ben-Gurion's resignation on 5 July 1959 after Ahdut HaAvoda and Mapam voted against the government during a vote on selling arms to West Germany and then refused to resign from the government. New elections were called in November that year after Ben-Gurion told President Yitzhak Ben-Zvi that he was unable to form a new government.

Cabinet members

1 Although Sapir was not an MK during the third Knesset, he was later an MK for Mapai.

2 Carmel did not enter the Knesset until 9 June 1958.

References

External links
Third Knesset: Government 8 Knesset website

 08
1958 establishments in Israel
1959 disestablishments in Israel
Cabinets established in 1958
Cabinets disestablished in 1959
1958 in Israeli politics
1959 in Israeli politics
 08